Turn on Your Radio is the sixth studio album by the Italian/U.S. ensemble Change. It was released in 1985 and reached number sixty-four on the US Billboard Black Albums chart, and number thirty-nine on the UK Albums Chart. Turn on Your Radio includes the singles "Let's Go Together", "Examination" (in Italy only), "Oh What A Feeling" and "Mutual Attraction".

The band recorded the songs for album at Morning Studios, Milan, Italy. The sessions were then taken to Atlantic Recording Studios, New York City to be mixed. Receiving negative reviews the album was originally released as an LP in April 1985. The album was released with two different artwork designs. The UK version released on Cooltempo Records was designed by Greg Porto and the photography was by Robert Lewis.

Reception

Turn on Your Radio received negative reviews by the majority of critics. Ron Wynn reviewing retrospectively for Allmusic marked the absence of a strong soulful-lead vocalist such as former Change collaborators Luther Vandross or James Robinson as a flaw. "The leads throughout this session, even on the lone successful single, "Let's Go Together," (which marked the group's final entry on the Billboard Hot 100.) were more efficient than distinctive". Wynn also noted that the production had faltered describing the arrangements of Jacques Fred Petrus as "recycled" takes on what had "once made the group a major act".

Track listing

Personnel
 Jacques Fred Petrus - Producer, Executive Producer (for Little Macho Music Co. Inc.)
 Timmy Allen - Co-Producer
 Timmy Allen - Bass, Keyboards, Synthesizer, Background Vocals
 Rick Brennen - Lead Vocals, Background Vocals
 Deborah Cooper - Lead Vocals, Background Vocals
 Vince Henry - Guitar, Saxophone
 Michael Campbell - Guitar, Assistant Rhythm Track Arranger

Recorded at Morning Studios, Milan, Italy.
Mixed at Atlantic Recording Studios, New York City.

 Carl Beatty - Mixing Engineer
 Dennis King - Mastering Engineer
 Robert Lewis - Photography
 Greg Porto - Cover Illustration (UK version)

Charts

References

1985 albums
Change (band) albums
Atlantic Records albums